Bellerophon Taming Pegasus is an outdoor sculpture by Jacques Lipchitz, depicting Bellerophon and Pegasus.  It was the final sculpture worked on by Lipchitz, and was completed after his death in 1973.

The work depicts the human figure of Bellerophon, standing on a high plinth, tying a rope around the neck of the thrashing Pegasus, whose tail, legs and wings splay dramatically around the central figures.  It has been interpreted as a representing man taming nature.  In the words of the artist, "You observe nature, make conclusions, and from these you make rules… and law is born from that".  It takes inspiration from Lipchitz's earlier work, Birth of the Muses, which depicts Pegasus landing on Mount Olympus.

The sculpture was commissioned by architect Max Abramovitz for Columbia Law School in 1964. It was cast in bronze at Pietrasanta in Italy, shipped in pieces to be constructed in New York City, and dedicated on November 28, 1977.  It is installed above the west entrance of Jerome Greene Hall on Revson Plaza, on the Columbia University campus in Manhattan. Nearby on the plaza are casts of Henry Moore's Three-Way Piece: Points, Tightrope Walker by Kees Verkade, Life Force by David Bakalar, and Flight by Gertrude Schweitzer.

The Tate Gallery in London holds a plaster "sketch" from 1964, presented by the Lipchitz Foundation in 1982. 
Another 1964 plaster "sketch" is held by the Museo Reina Sofía in Madrid.

A 12 foot bronze cast - about half the size of the original - is at the Broadgate development in London.  Another cast was installed in Kansas City in 2000.

See also

 1977 in art
 List of public art in the City of London

References

External links
 Pegasus and Bellarophon Dominate the Law School's Sky by Diana Greenwald (February, 2008), Columbia Spectator

1977 establishments in New York City
1977 sculptures
Bronze sculptures in New York City
Bronze sculptures in the United Kingdom
Columbia University campus
Horses in art
Modernist sculpture
Outdoor sculptures in London
Outdoor sculptures in Manhattan
Sculpture by Jacques Lipchitz
Sculptures of classical mythology